Mishkeegogamang First Nation is an Ojibway band government (First Nation) in the Canadian province of Ontario. Until 1993, the band was called the Osnaburgh First Nation, with various settlements at times being called New Osnaburgh, Osnaburgh House, or Osnaburgh ("Oz" for short).

The traditional territory of the Mishkeegogamang Ojibway extends to the north, south, east and west, beyond the boundaries of Reserves 63A and 63B. The traditional territory is made up of the communities of the Main Reserve, Bottle Hill, Poplar Heights, Sandy Road, Doghole Bay, Rat Rapids, Cedar Rapids, Ten Houses, Eric Lake, Ace Lake, Metcalfe, Pashkokogan, Mile 50, Fitchie Lake, Mile 42, Mile 29, Menako Lakes, and the shores of Lake St. Joseph.

Mother Tongues: Ojibwe Anishinaabemowin, ᐊᓂᔑᓈᐯᒧᐎᓐ

Its total registered population as of March 2022 is 2,028 (of which the on-reserve population was over 1,000 people as of the 2016 Census). At one time a member of the Windigo First Nations Council, Mishkeegogamang First Nation is not part of any regional tribal councils ; however, they have retained their membership with the Nishnawbe Aski Nation.

Geography
The Mishkeegogamang First Nation's landbase consists of two reserves, the smaller  Osnaburgh Indian Reserve 63A and the larger  Osnaburgh Indian Reserve 63B.

Oz is made up of separate and somewhat geographically disconnected communities. On their main reserve are the communities of Bottle Hill, Poplar Heights and Sandy Road. Additionally, some small communities called Doghole Bay, Eric Lake, Ace Lake and a few others are also associated with Osnaburgh.

History

Early history
The Mishkeegogamang people are Ojibway who are believed to have originated in the Great Lakes region. The tribe might have moved north when European Hudson's Bay Company traders started establishing interior posts and routes, or possibly beforehand. Their arrival pushed the previous Cree occupants farther northward.

The community maintains strong ties with Cat Lake First Nation, Slate Falls First Nation and the Ojibway Nation of Saugeen.

Osnaburgh House
As the Hudson's Bay Company sought to establish interior trading posts to compete with rival companies, it sent John Best along the Albany River to scout locations for such a post. He chose a spot near the northeast end of Lake St. Joseph and called the post Osnaburgh House. The house itself survived for around 200 years, later giving its name to the settlement of Osnaburgh and postal code of P0V 2H0, which lay directly across the lake from the house. The house was abandoned in 1963, after which it fell into ruin. Since the 1980s, the site (which is not inside the boundaries of the first nation) has been the Old Post Lodge fishing camp.

Twentieth and twenty-first century
In 1905, the Government of Canada sent commissioners to the area to attain the land for the Crown. Treaty 9 between them and the Mishkeegogamang (among other groups) set aside two pieces of land for reserves (Osnaburgh 63A and 63B) with the promise that the people would not necessarily have to live on the reserves and would have full use of all of their traditional lands. The tribe was formalised at this time with Missabay chosen as the first chief and a band and council system was instituted.

The completion of Highway 599 in 1954 from Savant Lake to an earlier mine road brought great social change to the Mishkeegogamang.  The highway was several kilometres from Osnaburgh village (in Osnaburgh 63A), so the government encouraged people to move a new village, New Osnaburgh, on Doghole Lake (Osnaburgh 63B) which today is the Main Reserve.

On 15 November 1993, the Band Council changed the name of the group from Osnaburgh First Nation to its current name.

Mishkeegogamang First Nation's Junior Canadian Ranger (JCR) patrol was named the best Junior Ranger patrol in Ontario for 2014 and 2019, making Mishkeegogamang the first JCR patrol to win the coveted trophy twice. The patrol consists of JCRs from Mishkeegogamang and the nearby town of Sioux Lookout as well as from Ojibway Nation of Saugeen. A dedicated group of drivers transports the JCRs to meetings, training exercises, and events. The Junior Canadian Rangers is a Canadian Army program for boys and girls aged 12 to 18 across Canada's North. There are more than 1,000 JCRs in 27 First Nations across the Far North of Ontario. Camp Loon is an advanced training camp for JCRs held annually in the forest north of Geraldton.

Governance
Mishkeegogamang First Nation is governed by one Chief and five Band Councillors who are elected every two years.

The Mishkeegogamang Chief & Council do not have a suitable Band government building and find themselves working from home or in other department offices. Mishkeegogamang is not affiliated with any tribal organization, but is associated with Nishnawbe Aski Nation lobby group.

Mishkeegogamang is policed by the Nishnawbe-Aski Police Service, an aboriginal-based service. Mishkeegogamang does not observe daylight saving time.

The area is in the Kenora federal riding and the Kiiwetinoong provincial electoral district. Kiiwetinoong has a population of 32,987 and means "North" in Ojibwe. Kiiwetinoong is 68 percent indigenous.

Membership Authority

Section 11 Band

Election System

Indian Act

Council Quorum

4

Mishkeegogaamang First Nation Chief and Council (2021-2023)

References

External links

* 
 AANDC profile
 052O01 Osnaburgh House Topographic Map
 Map of Osnaburgh First Nation
 Map of (old) Osnaburgh in 1959

First Nations governments in Ontario
Ojibwe governments
Communities in Kenora District
Nishnawbe Aski Nation